Michael McDonagh, a national of Ireland, is a humanitarian, and a senior United Nations official working for the United Nations Office for the Coordination of Humanitarian Affairs.

He is working as head of the OCHA office in Ethiopia.  Previous to joining OCHA, McDonagh worked for the Irish NGO, Concern, for more than 20 years, including serving as country director in Laos, Somalia, Angola, Rwanda, Sierra Leone, Liberia, North Korea, Honduras, Albania and Zimbabwe.  He joined OCHA in 2004, coordinating Darfur specifically.  In 2007, he was appointed head of that office. During his tenure, he has advocated for a strong humanitarian response to the Darfur crisis, and drew international attention to the recurrent attacks on humanitarian workers in Darfur and the impact these have on humanitarian aid. After Sudan, McDonagh was head of OCHA-Iraq and OCHA-Libya.

References

Irish humanitarians
Year of birth missing (living people)
Living people
20th-century Irish people
21st-century Irish people
Irish officials of the United Nations